The Lydia Plantation, also known as the Benjamin Sydney Josey Farm, in Lydia, South Carolina is a historic plantation and house. The house was designed by Charles Coker Wilson and his firm Wilson, Sompayrac & Urquhart.  It was built in 1910 and expanded in 1920.

A  area including the plantation house was listed as a historic district on the U.S. National Register of Historic Places in 2010.  It is listed for its architecture and/or engineering.  The listing includes 16 contributing buildings, one additional contributing site and one additional contributing structure.

A sixteen-sided office and two octagonal farm buildings are included in the property.

References

National Register of Historic Places in Darlington County, South Carolina
Octagonal buildings in the United States
Neoclassical architecture in South Carolina
Houses completed in 1910
Houses in Darlington County, South Carolina
Historic districts on the National Register of Historic Places in South Carolina